Shawn Walker (born February 2, 1972) is an American basketball coach and the former head coach of Grambling State University Tigers men's basketball program and former assistant coach and college basketball player.

Walker's contract with Grambling was not renewed following the 2016–17 season.

Div I Coaching Record

References

1972 births
Living people
American men's basketball coaches
American men's basketball players
Basketball coaches from North Carolina
Basketball players from North Carolina
College men's basketball head coaches in the United States
Elizabeth City State Vikings men's basketball coaches
Elizabeth City State Vikings men's basketball players
Grambling State Tigers men's basketball coaches
Voorhees Tigers men's basketball coaches